Ruben B. White was a pastor and state senator in Arkansas. His older brother James T. White also served in the state legislature. He had mixed ancestry. He served in 1873 with John Goad representing Pulaski and White counties.

References

Republican Party Arkansas state senators